Cantaclaro is a 1946 Mexican drama film directed by Julio Bracho and starring Esther Fernandez, Antonio Badú and Alberto Galán. The film is based on the 1934 novel of the same name by Rómulo Gallegos. The film's sets were designed by the art director Jesús Bracho.

Plot 
Florentino (Antonio Badú), nicknamed "Cantaclaro", after saving his family's lands, goes to the plains to learn more songs to sing. There he falls in love with Rosángela (Esther Fernandez), a young woman surrounded by many secrets.

Cast 
 Esther Fernandez as Rosangela / Angela Rosa 
 Antonio Badú as Florentino Coronado Cantaclaro 
 Alberto Galán as Doctor Juan Crisostomo Payara 
 Paco Fuentes as Juan Parado 
 Rafael Lanzetta as Guarriqueño 
 Fanny Schiller as Doña Nico 
 Rafael Alcayde as Carlos Jaramillo 
 Ángel T. Sala as Coronel Buitrago 
 Alejandro Ciangherotti as Juan el Veguero 
 Maruja Grifell as Nana 
 Arturo Soto Rangel as Don Aquilino 
 Gilberto González 
 Salvador Quiroz
 Roberto Cañedo

Production 
The film was made as part of a spate of film adaptations of Rómulo Gallegos's novels following success of Doña Bárbara (1943).

Cantaclaro began filming in June 1945, after Julio Bracho made The White Monk. An American envoy from 20th Century Fox, Francis Alstock, boyfriend of actress Esther Fernandez, who starred in the film, featured as executive producer. It features filming locations in Veracruz.

Reception 
In Los Bracho: tres generaciones de cine mexicano, Jesús Ibarra states that at the time of the film's premiere, "the critics were divided their opinions and the public did not like it," stating that "despite the beautiful and fluid language, the dialogues were long and the film a bit boring," with Global Mexican Cinema: Its Golden Age citing that "some contemporary critics have generally labeled Cantaclaro, along with most or all of the Gallegos films, 'mediocre'". However, Ibarra also stated that with the film "the same thing happened as with The White Monk; Bracho made art cinema, not suitable for the Mexican public in general", going so far as to argue, when mentioning that the film won fewer Ariel Awards than Emilio Fernández's film Enamorada that year, that Bracho's film was "much more worthy of being awarded" than Fernández's film.

References

External links 
 

1946 films
1946 drama films
Mexican drama films
1940s Spanish-language films
Films directed by Julio Bracho
Films based on Venezuelan novels
Mexican black-and-white films
1940s Mexican films